The Furchetta is a mountain of the Geisler group in the Dolomites in South Tyrol, Italy.

The Furchetta mountain is in the group of Odle and has been named after the great rift that divides it in two. The starting point of the mountain is in the Refuge Florence, which is reached in about 20 minutes from the mountain station of the gondola Santa Cristina Col Raiser.

References 

 Franz Moroder: Zur Topographie und Nomenclatur der Geisslerspitzen-Gruppe. Aus: Mitteilungen der Deutschen und Österreichischen Alpenvereins, Nr. 15, 1887

External links 

Mountains of the Alps
Mountains of South Tyrol
Alpine three-thousanders
Dolomites